Dolichoderus lutosus is a species of ant in the genus Dolichoderus. Described by Smith in 1858, the species is endemic to both North and South America.

References

Dolichoderus
Hymenoptera of South America
Insects described in 1858